Saint Agnes High School, St Agnes High School, or St. Agnes High School may refer to:

Australia
St Agnes Catholic High School, a secondary school in Rooty Hill, New South Wales, Australia

India
St. Agnes High School, Mumbai, a girls school in Mumbai, India

United States
Saint Agnes High School (Saint Paul, Minnesota), a private, Roman Catholic high school in Saint Paul, Minnesota, United States
St. Agnes Academic High School (Queens), an all-girls private, Roman Catholic high school in Queens, New York
St. Agnes Boys High School, a former private, Roman Catholic, all-boys high school in New York City that operated from 1914 to 2013